John Donnelly (17 December 1936 – 31 July 2009) was a Scottish footballer who played for Celtic and Preston North End. Donnelly was part of the Celtic side that defeated Rangers 7–1 in the 1957 Scottish League Cup Final.

References

External links

1936 births
2009 deaths
Scottish footballers
Association football fullbacks
Armadale Thistle F.C. players
Celtic F.C. players
Preston North End F.C. players
Scottish Football League players
English Football League players
Scottish expatriate footballers
Expatriate soccer players in South Africa
Scottish expatriate sportspeople in South Africa
Addington F.C. players
Sportspeople from Broxburn, West Lothian
Footballers from West Lothian